Leucopogon deformis is a species of flowering plant in the heath family Ericaceae and is endemic to eastern coastal Australia. It is a bushy shrub with narrowly egg-shaped leaves, and white, tube-shaped flowers.

Description

Taxonomy and naming
Leucopogon deformis was first formally described in 1810 by Robert Brown in his Prodromus Florae Novae Hollandiae et Insulae Van Diemen. The specific epithet (deformis) means "departing from the correct shape".

Distribution and habitat
This leucopogon grows in coastal heath from Hawks Nest in New South Wales to south-east Queensland.

References

deformis
Ericales of Australia
Flora of Western Australia
Plants described in 1810
Taxa named by Jacques Labillardière